The Palace Theatre is a 1920s-era movie palace in the village of Eastwood in Syracuse, New York.  It has been owned and operated by the same family for more than 80 years.

History 

The Palace was built in 1922 by local businessman Alfred DiBella. The theater featured 1300 seating, a second floor dining and dance ballroom. After Alfred died in 1959, ownership was transferred to his daughter, Frances DiBella, who was behind the cash register or the popcorn counter nearly every night for more than fifty years.  On her death on April 26, 2004, ownership passed to her nephew, Michael Heagerty, who embarked on an extensive renovation of the theatre including opening The Palace Café next door (which has since been closed).  Until the doors shut for renovation in 2004, the theatre had reputedly never been closed for more than a week during its entire history.  Renovations included the installation of a digital high-definition video system, Dolby Surround Sound, and laptop presentation capability with the largest computer graphic projection in Central New York.

Despite a temporary setback due to flooding soon after it reopened, the theatre is presently a lively venue for current and classic movies, meetings, parties, speeches, live concerts, lectures, benefits, and other community events.  Syracuse Mayor Matthew Driscoll delivered his 2005 "State of the City" address at The Palace, and it hosts an annual B-Movie Film Festival that draws attendees from all over the world.

The Palace has been independently owned and operated throughout its history.  It is one of three independent movie theatres in Syracuse; the others are the Hollywood in the hamlet of Mattydale near the Syracuse airport; and the Manlius Art Cinema in Manlius.

References

External links 
 Palace Theatre home page

Concert halls in New York (state)
Theatres in New York (state)
Buildings and structures in Syracuse, New York
Culture of Syracuse, New York
Tourist attractions in Syracuse, New York